The Soviet Union's 1990 nuclear test series was a group of 2 nuclear tests conducted in 1990–1991. These tests  followed the 1989 Soviet nuclear tests series .

References

1990
Nuclear tests
Nuclear tests
1990 in military history
1991 in military history
Explosions in 1990
Explosions in 1991
October 1990 events in Asia
May 1991 events in Asia